Morris A. Schapiro Hall, popularly known as Schapiro, is an undergraduate residence hall of Columbia University. The building is named after investment banker Morris Schapiro, who oversaw the merger of Chase Bank and Bank of Manhattan as well as the Chemical Bank and New York Trust Company. 

It is located half a block from the university's main campus, near the intersection of Broadway and 115th Street in the Morningside Heights neighborhood of the borough of Manhattan in New York City. Upon its completion in 1988, at a cost of $18 million, Schapiro allowed the university to house all its undergraduates in dormitories for the first time. This policy is now promised to all current and incoming undergraduate students at Columbia and Barnard. The 17-story building is one of the newer residences at Columbia and contains 245 single and 85 double residences, music practice rooms, floor lounges, and two study spaces. The "Penthouse," the 17th floor, has a quiet study space for students and no residential rooms. The building was designed by the architectural firm Gruzen Samton Steinglass.

Famous residents 

 Patrick Radden Keefe, American author and winner of the Baillie Gifford Prize in 2021

References

External links

Schapiro Hall at Columbia Housing
Housing the Columbia Community, lecture by Professor Andrew S. Dolkart on October 5, 1999
Home on the Heights: 100 Years of Housing at Columbia by Michael Foss, Columbia College Today, September 2005

Columbia University dormitories
University and college dormitories in the United States